Chandrakala is a dessert from Bihar, similar to gujia. The outer covering is made of flour and the stuffing is traditionally made using dry fruits like raisins, coconut, almonds, and cashews, along with khoa, semolina, cardamom, sugar, and pistachio. Chandrakala gets the name from the shape. Chandrakala is Chandran means Moon, so its half-moon shape.

References

Indian desserts